Blandfordia punicea, commonly known as Tasmanian Christmas bell,  is a species of flowering plant that is endemic to western Tasmania. It is a tufted perennial herb with linear leaves and drooping red, bell-shaped flowers that are yellow on the inside.

Description
The stamens are attached above the middle of the flower tube. The flowers are mostly red on the outside with yellow on the inside and are usually very prominent in their native habitat, often rising above ground-level vegetation between mid-spring and early autumn.

Taxonomy and naming
The Tasmanian Christmas bell was first formally described in 1805 by Jacques Labillardière who gave it the name Aletris punicea and published the description in Novae Hollandiae Plantarum Specimen. In 1830, Robert Sweet changed the name to Blandfordia punicea. The specific epithet (punicea) is a Latin word meaning "reddish" or "purplish-red".

Distribution and habitat
Blandfordia punicea grows in button grass (Gymnoschoenus sphaerocephalus) and damp heath, mostly west of a line between Bruny Island and Rocky Cape.

Culture
An Australian 50c stamp depicting the species was issued on 13 February 2007.

References

Flora of Tasmania
Blandfordiaceae
Plants described in 1805